Desmarestia is a genus of brown algae found worldwide. However, 'sea sorrel' can also specifically refer to Desmarestia viridis. Members of this genus can be either annual or perennial. Annual members of this genus store sulfuric acid in intracellular vacuoles. When exposed to air they release the acid, thereby destroying themselves and nearby seaweeds in the process. They are found in shallow intertidal zones.

Ingesting sulfuric acid can cause severe digestive problems. but since sulfuric acid tastes extremely sour, members of the genus are unlikely to be eaten in harmful quantities.

The genus was named in honor of Anselme Gaëtan Desmarest.

Species
AlgaeBase lists 32 currently accepted species within the genus Desmarestia, not including variations and subspecies.

 Desmarestia aculeata (L.) J.V.Lamouroux - Type specimen for the genus
 Desmarestia anceps (Montagne)
 Desmarestia antarctica (R.L.Moe & P.C.Silva)
 Desmarestia chordalis (J.D.Hooker & Harvey)
 Desmarestia confervoides (Bory de Saint-Vincent) M.E.Ramírez & A.F.Peters
 Desmarestia distans (C.Agardh) J.Agardh
 Desmarestia dudresnayi J.V.Lamouroux ex Léman
 Desmarestia farcta Setchell & Gardner
 Desmarestia filamentosa E.Y.Dawson
 Desmarestia firma (C.Agardh) Skottsberg
 Desmarestia foliacea V.A.Pease
 Desmarestia gayana Montagne
 Desmarestia herbacea (Turner) J.V.Lamouroux
 Desmarestia inanis Postels & Ruprecht
 Desmarestia intermedia Postels & Ruprecht
 Desmarestia kurilensis Yamada
 Desmarestia latifrons (Ruprecht) Kützing
 Desmarestia latissima Setchell & Gardner
 Desmarestia ligulata (Stackhouse) J.V.Lamouroux
 Desmarestia menziesii J.Agardh
 Desmarestia muelleri M.E.Ramírez & A.F.Peters
 Desmarestia munda Setchell & N.L.Gardner
 Desmarestia patagonica Asensi
 Desmarestia peruviana Montagne
 Desmarestia pinnatinervia Montagne
 Desmarestia pteridoides Reinsch
 Desmarestia rossii J.D.Hooker & Harvey
 Desmarestia sivertsenii Baardseth
 Desmarestia tabacoides Okamura
 Desmarestia tortuosa A.R.O. Chapman
 Desmarestia tropica W.R.Taylor - tropical acidweed
 Desmarestia viridis (O.F.Müller) J.V.Lamouroux - stringy acid kelp, green acid kelp, Desmarest's green weed, or sea sorrel

Gallery

References

Brown algae genera
Desmarestiales